The Lone Star Ranger is a lost 1923 American silent Western film directed by Lambert Hillyer and starring Tom Mix. It is based on the novel by Zane Grey. Fox produced and distributed by Fox Films and this film is a remake of their 1919 film with William Farnum.

Cast
 Tom Mix - Duane
 Billie Dove - Helen Longstreth
 Lee Shumway - Lawson (* as L. C. Shumway)
 Stanton Heck - Roggin
 Edward Peil Sr. - Kane
 Frank Clark - Laramie
 Minna Redman - Mrs. Laramie
 Francis Carpenter - Laramie's Son
 William Conklin - Major Longstreth/Cheseldine
 Thomas G. Lingham - Captain McNally

See also
 1937 Fox vault fire

References

External links
  The Lone Star Ranger at IMDb.com
 

1923 films
Lost Western (genre) films
1923 Western (genre) films
Films directed by Lambert Hillyer
Films based on American novels
Films based on Western (genre) novels
Films based on works by Zane Grey
Fox Film films
Lost American films
American black-and-white films
1923 lost films
Silent American Western (genre) films
1920s American films
1920s English-language films